Poland competed at the 2002 Winter Paralympics in Salt Lake City, United States. A total of 14 competitors from Poland won 3 medals, 1 gold and 2 bronze, and finished 17th in the medal table.

Medalists

Gold
 Wieslaw Fiedor - Cross-country skiing, 10 km Individual Classic LW12

Bronze
 Bogumiła Kapłoniak - Biathlon, 7,5 km Standing Pursuit
 Wieslaw Fiedor - Cross-country skiing, 5 km Individual Classic LW12

Alpine skiing

Biathlon

Cross-country skiing

See also 
 Poland at the Paralympics
 Poland at the 2002 Winter Olympics

References 

Poland at the Paralympics
Winter Paralympics
Nations at the 2002 Winter Paralympics